In enzymology, SEPHCHC synthase  (EC ), encoded by menD gene in E. coli, is an enzyme that catalyzes the second step of menaquinone (vitamin K2) biosynthesis. The two substrates of this enzyme are 2-oxoglutarate and isochorismate. The products of this enzyme are 5-enolpyruvoyl-6-hydroxy-2-succinyl-cyclohex-3-ene-1-carboxylate and CO2. It belongs to the transferase family.

Classification 
This enzyme belongs to a family of enzymes that transfer aldehyde or ketonic groups. To be specific, this enzyme belongs to the transketolase and transaldolase families. Common names for the enzyme are:
 MenD
 SEPHCHC synthase
 2-succinyl-5-enolpyruvyl-6-hydroxy-3-cyclohexene-1-carboxylic-acid synthase
 Systematic name: isochorismate:2-oxoglutarate 4-oxopentanoatetransferase

Reaction 
In the biosynthesis of vitamin K, SEPHCHC is involved in the second step of the pathway. The type of reaction is decarboxylating, and to have maximum activity, this enzymes uses the cofactor Mg2+, a magnesium ion. In previous years, it was thought that this reaction led to SHCHC, the product MenH. After further research, we now know that this reaction is a new step in the pathway. The actual product of this enzyme can lose a pyruvate spontaneously.

Structure 
The structures reveal a stable dimer-of-dimers association in agreement with gel filtration and analytical studies confirm the classification of MenD in the pyruvate oxidase family. The active site is highly basic with a hydrophobic patch. These features match with the chemical properties of the substrates.

Homologues 
There are many similar structures MenD. Though it is commonly found in E. Coli, but can be found in other organisms as well. Bacillus subtilis and Mycobacterium tuberculosis are two homologues. All of the organisms share something in common, being that catalyze decarboxylation reactions.

References 

Bacterial enzymes
EC 2.2.1